Brachyglene subtilis is a moth of the family Notodontidae first described by Cajetan and Rudolf Felder in 1874. It is common
in the dry forests of northern Venezuela, but is also found in Colombia and Paraguay.

The larvae feed on Bauhinia splendens.

References

Moths described in 1874
Notodontidae of South America